Ecuador competed at the 2019 Military World Games held in Wuhan, China from 18 to 27 October 2019. In total, athletes representing Ecuador won one silver medal and the country finished in 49th place in the medal table.

Medal summary

Medal by sports

Medalists

References 
 2019 Military World Games Results

Nations at the 2019 Military World Games
2019 in Ecuadorian sport